USS Rogers has been the name of more than one United States Navy ship, and may refer to:

 USS Rogers (DE-772), a destroyer escort laid down in 1943 and renamed  in 1944 prior to launching
 , a destroyer in commission from 1945 to 1980

United States Navy ship names